Serhiy Demydyuk (born June 5, 1982) is a Ukrainian hurdler.

Career
He won a bronze medal at the 2003 Summer Universiade, and competed at the 2004 Olympics where he was knocked out in the heats. He finished eighth in the 110 m hurdles final at the 2006 European Athletics Championships, and fifth in 60 m hurdles at the 2007 European Indoor Championships.

His personal best time is 13.22 seconds, achieved in August 2007 in Osaka (6th in World Champs).

Competition record

External links

1982 births
Living people
Ukrainian male hurdlers
Athletes (track and field) at the 2004 Summer Olympics
Olympic athletes of Ukraine
Universiade medalists in athletics (track and field)
Kyiv National University of Trade and Economics alumni
Universiade gold medalists for Ukraine
Universiade bronze medalists for Ukraine